Harlequin Games is a business which designs and moderates PBM games by email of which their Legends (PBM) engine is the most recognized.  From their "About Us" page - "We fuse wild imagination with good game-play in everything we produce and do so with professionalism and love for the hobby.  Established in 1994, Harlequin has quickly grown into one of the largest postal/email gaming firms in the world, and we look forward to maintaining a long and happy relationship with our players."

Harlequin Games was winner of the Gamers' Choice Origins Award in 2004 for the play by email game Legends (PBM).

List of games 
 North Island Campaign
 Twilight Crusade
 Immortals Realm
 Swords of Pelarn
 Adventures in Avalon
 Crown of Chaos
 The One Ring
 Blood Tides Rising

External links
Harlequin Games ~ The home of Legends 
Middle Earth Games 
SV Graz ~ The German franchisee of the Legends 
The Legends Corner ~ Aayko Eyma's great old Legends site.

References

Companies based in Cardiff
Play-by-mail game publishing companies